Christopher Dwayne Sanders (born May 8, 1972) is a former American football wide receiver who was a multi-sport athlete at the Ohio State University before playing seven seasons in the National Football League for the  Houston/Tennessee Oilers/Titans. He attended Montbello High School in Denver, Colorado. His career 18.6 yards per reception ranks among the top-20 in NFL history. Sanders, however, holds the dubious NFL record for the fewest career rushing yards. He rushed 4 times in his career - all for negative yards.

Ohio State
Sanders was a member of the Ohio State track and field team from 1992 to 1994.  On February 15, 1992 he set the school record in the indoor long jump (26'9.75").  That record still stands.  He was also a member of two relay teams (4x100 and 4x200) that also set Ohio State records.

On the Ohio State football team Sanders was a three-year starter at the flanker position.  He had 71 career receptions for 1,120 total yards, and was such a strong team contributor that for two years he kept future Biletnikoff-winner Terry Glenn on the second team.

Sanders was named the Ohio State Athlete of the Year, across all sports, in 1994.

Houston Oilers/Tennessee Titans
Sanders was selected by the Houston Oilers in the third round of the 1995 NFL Draft.  He stayed with that organization for seven years, completing 177 career receptions for 3,285 total yards. He also holds record for fewest rushing yards in combined career games played after the AFL/NFL merger with -36. This also represents the fewest in the Oilers/Titans franchise history. In 1999, the Titans made it to Super Bowl XXXIV in which Sanders appeared as a substitute, however they lost to the Kurt Warner-led St. Louis Rams.

Coaching career
In 2005, Sanders began coaching at Christ Presbyterian Academy (CPA), a private K-12 school located in Nashville, TN. While at CPA he worked as an assistant coach in both football and track. During the summer of 2008, he left CPA and began coaching the wide receivers position and the track team at Montgomery Bell Academy (MBA), an all-male private school also located in Nashville.

Personal
 Sanders was known by the nickname "Tippy Toes" as a college player for his graceful gait.
 Sanders' son C.J. is a child actor best known for his role as the young Ray Charles in the movie Ray. In 2014, C.J. committed to play football at the University of Notre Dame as a wide receiver.

References

1972 births
Living people
Players of American football from Denver
American football wide receivers
Ohio State Buckeyes football players
Houston Oilers players
Tennessee Oilers players
Tennessee Titans players